Brachycerus ornatus, common name red-spotted lily weevil or moose face lily weevil, is a species of family Curculionidae, subfamily Brachycerinae.

Description
The body is black, with red spots and markings. The abdomen is quite rounded and the pronotum is strongly ridged, with round tubercles. Adult beetles feed on foliage of lily ( Ammocharis coranica) and females lay  eggs in burrows close to the bulbs, while larvae feed on the bulbs and pupate in the soil.

Distribution
This species occurs in regions of Sub-Saharan Africa; it is common in Tanzania. It breeds oftenest in areas where the soil is clay.

References 

  Zipcodezoo
  Catalogue of Life
  Mike Picker,Charles Griffiths,Alan Weaving - Field guide to insects of South Africa

External links 
  Brachycerus-ornatus
 Phasmidsin Cyberspace
 Biodiversity Explorer
 Nature of South Africa

Brachycerinae